Gökhem in Västergötland was originally part of Vilske härad and is since 1974, a part of the Falköping Municipality.

Gökhem Church is in Gökhem.

References

Populated places in Västra Götaland County
Populated places in Falköping Municipality